An Association of Peaceis an official grouping of conservative Laestadians. In Europe there are 214 Associations of Peace: 179 in Finland, eight in Russia, five in Sweden, one in Norway and one in Estonia. There are also three central organizations: SRK in Finland, SFC in Sweden and Estonian Lutheran Association of Pecae in Estonia. The Laestadian Lutheran Church does mission work worldwide in collaboration with Association of Peace organizations.

See also 

Conservative Laestadianism
Laestadianism
Laestadianism in America
SRK, Central Association of Finnish Association of Peace
SFC, Sveriges fridsföreningarnas centralorganisation
Estonian Lutheran Association of Peace
Laestadian Lutheran Church

External links 

SRK
List of associations in Finland

References 

Lutheranism in Finland
Laestadianism
Lutheran organizations